Aileen Tan (born 18 October 1966) is a Singaporean actress.

Life and career
She was educated at the now defunct Willow Secondary School.

Tan was often cast in leading roles in the first 15 years of her acting career, but has since played supporting roles in recent years.

She has been nominated multiple times in the Best Actress category at the annual Star Awards. She was nominated for the "Best Actress" award in 1995, 1996, 1997, 2001, 2002, and 2003; she won the award once in 2001 for her role in Three Women and a Half, playing a manager in an advertising company who would make use of her looks and charms to climb up the corporate ladder. Tan took a break from television in 2005. In 2006, she appeared in two Singapore dramas, Women of Times and Measure of Man, the latter drama clinching the runner-up position in 2006's television viewership ratings. Tan also ventured into English dramas. In 2000, she played Mae in MediaCorp Channel 5's longest-running drama series, Growing Up. Later in 2009, she played Suzanne Kong, the wife of a tycoon in the 40-episode drama Red Thread. In 2013, Tan won the "Best Actress in a Supporting Role" award at the 18th Asian Television Awards (ATA) for her role in The Day It Rained on Our Parade which consisted only four episodes. On 29 May 2015, it was announced that Tan will play the lead role in Jack Neo's film, Long Long Time Ago alongside Mark Lee and Wang Lei. At Star Awards 2017, Tan received the Best Supporting Actress for the drama Hero (2016 TV series). She announced in a speech that this would be the last time she would go on stage to receive this award. In Star Awards 2018, she landed her 4th nomination for Best Supporting Actress for the drama, Have a Little Faith.

Tan has gotten 2 out of 10 Top 10 Most Popular Female Artistes from 1994, 1997 respectively.

Personal life
Tan's parents are of Hokkien descent.

She married Hong Kong film director Gerald Lee in 2002. She experienced an ectopic pregnancy in 2006, which eventually led to an abortion.

Filmography

Television

Films

Awards and nominations

References

External links

Living people
1966 births
Singaporean people of Hokkien descent
Singaporean television actresses
Singaporean film actresses
20th-century Singaporean actresses
21st-century Singaporean actresses